CDDA may refer to:
 Circularly Disposed Dipole Array – a large circular antenna used by the military 
 Compact Disc Digital Audio (CD-DA) – an audio recording format
 Company Directors Disqualification Act 1986 – a piece of UK company law, which sets out the procedureschdc for company directors to be disqualified in certain cases of misconduct.
 Common Database on Designated Areas – a database of the European Environment Agency (EEA) about nationally designated sites, nature protection sites such as national parks and nature reserves 
 Cataclysm: Dark Days Ahead – an open source post-apocalyptic survival roguelike video game